The 1968 Edmonton municipal election was held on October 16, 1968, to elect a mayor and twelve aldermen to sit on Edmonton City Council and seven trustees to sit on each of the public and separate school boards.  The electorate also decided three plebiscite questions.

On May 2, 1968, the Legislative Assembly of Alberta passed the Municipal Elections Act.  this Act had three major effects: first, it standardized municipal terms as being three years in all Alberta municipalities.  Second, it standardized the date on which municipal elections in Alberta would be held – the nomination deadline would be the third Monday of September and the election would be four weeks later.  Third, it allowed for the election of aldermen by ward, rather than at large.

This election was conducted under the new Act, and included a plebiscite to move to a ward system.  It was approved by the electorate, and the 1968 election was the last in which aldermen were elected at large (although a 1970 by-election also elected an alderman at large, before the ward system was introduced in the 1971 election).

In addition to choosing members for City Council, citizens were asked to vote on three plebiscites.  One plebiscite was on whether to switch to wards for election of city councillors. Another was whether or not council should have control over hours of operation of retail stores.

One plebiscite was related to a question rejected by voters in 1963, asking if the city should purchase land and build a combined sports and convention complex.  The 1968 plebiscite saw voters agree to "construction of a Trade Convention and Sports Complex" in downtown Edmonton.  Two years later, voters later rejected the specific, 50% more costly, Omniplex project plebiscite.  The single-site sports and convention concept was later served by the distributed Northlands Coliseum (opened 1974), Commonwealth Stadium (1978), and Edmonton Convention Centre (1983, a few metres south of the 1963 site).

Voter turnout

There were 93,129 ballots cast out of 238,828 eligible voters, for a voter turnout of 39%.

Results

(bold indicates elected, italics indicate incumbent)

Mayor

Ivor Dent – 34,722
Reginald Easton – 27,365
John Leslie Bodie – 26,951

Aldermen
Voters could cast up to 12 votes.
822,000 votes were marked.
The successful candidates received about 470,000 votes.
The two most popular candidates were the choice of a majority of voters.

Elected
Morris Weinlos – 49,527
James Bateman – 45,685 (his family ran a chain of grocery stores)
Una Evans – 44,025 (reformer, husband was Art Evans, Edmonton Journal writer
Ed Leger – 42,636
Cec Purves – 40,699
Neil Crawford – 39,190 (later Conservative MLA)
Kenneth Newman – 37,607
Ches Tanner – 36,191
Julia Kiniski – 35,760
Terry Nugent – 34,451
Kathleen McCallum – 34,059
David Ward – 29,770

Not elected
Bev Booker – 29,652
Terry Cavanagh – 28,981
Norbert Berkowitz – 28,394
Pat Shewchuk – 26,395
Catherine Chichak – 24,835
G Dale Newcombe – 24,403
Bill McLean – 24,185
Don Ross – 21,837
Ron Hayter – 21,511
G A (Pat) O'Hara – 18,310
A Terry Laing – 16,155
Lila Fahlman – 15,485
John Matlock – 12,543
John Lakusta – 11,965
Douglas Tomlinson – 10,189 (member of the Communist Party)
Charles Jenkins – 9543
Walter Makowecki – 7962
Wilson Arthur Stewart – 7951
Bernard Mazurewicz – 6848
Abner Abraham Rubin – 5339

Public school trustees

Separate (Catholic) school trustees

Plebiscites

Ward System

Are you in favour of the City being divided into areas known as wards, of not less than three (3) and not more than ten (10) in number for the holding of elections of Alderman to City Council at future elections?
Yes – 45938
No – 28594

Convention and Sports Complex

Do you favour the construction of a Trade Convention and Sports Complex containing facilities such as a covered Football stadium and Ice Arena, and a Trade & Convention Centre, at an estimated capital cost of Twenty-three Million Dollars ($23,000,000.00) and to be operated at an estimated annual deficit of not more than two million?
Yes – 57568
No – 21458

Council Control of Store Hours

Do you want shop hours in the City of Edmonton to be controlled by City Council?
Yes – 24672
No – 55489

If shop hours are controlled, which do you favour:
(a.) six days and two evenings – 58533
(b.) five days and two evenings – 8539
(c.) five and one-half days and one evening – 11776

References

City of Edmonton: Edmonton Elections

1968
1968 elections in Canada
1968 in Alberta